Milo Ventura Chávez (born July 14, 1947) is a Mexican professional wrestler best known under the ring name Ultraman. He is the father of Ultraman Jr., but is not related to the first wrestler to use that name, who is now known as Starman. He originally used the name El Dinámico when he made his debut in 1964 and later worked under the name Milo Ventura from 1968 to 1975.

While he was unmasked in Mexico in 1987 he continued to wrestle under a mask in Japan, where he was very popular due to the character being based on the Ultraman television character. Chávez, El Solar and Super Astro formed a trio known as Los Cadetes del Espacio ("The Space Cadets").

Championships and accomplishments
Empresa Mexicana de Lucha Libre
Mexican National Middleweight Championship (1 time)

Luchas de Apuestas record

Footnotes

References

1947 births
Living people
Masked wrestlers
Mexican male professional wrestlers
Professional wrestlers from Guanajuato
20th-century professional wrestlers
Mexican National Middleweight Champions
21st-century professional wrestlers